Eighteenth-Century Studies is an academic journal established in 1966 and the official publication of the American Society for Eighteenth-Century Studies. It focuses on all aspects of 18th century history. It is related to the annual Studies in Eighteenth-Century Culture. The current editor-in-chief is Ramesh Mallipeddi (University of British Columbia). The journal is published quarterly in October, January, April, and July by the Johns Hopkins University Press.

External links
 
 American Society for Eighteenth-Century Studies
 Eighteenth-Century Studies  at Project MUSE

History journals
Johns Hopkins University Press academic journals
English-language journals
Publications established in 1966
Quarterly journals
1966 establishments in the United States